Cesta is a village in the Municipality of Dobrepolje in the historical region of Lower Carniola in Slovenia. The municipality is now included in the Central Slovenia Statistical Region.

A small roadside chapel-shrine in the southern part of the settlement dates to the late 19th century.

References

External links
Cesta on Geopedia

Populated places in the Municipality of Dobrepolje